Bolonia is a coastal village and beach in the municipality of Tarifa in the Province of Cadiz in southern Spain. It is located on the Atlantic shore,  by road west of Tarifa, but is much closer in terms of coastal distance. The beach and bay is also known as Playa de Bolonia ("Bolonia Beach"), Ensenada de Bolonia ("Bolonia Cove"), or Bolonia Bay. The ruins of the Roman town of Baelo Claudia are located near the beach, considered to be the most complete Roman town ruins yet uncovered in Spain. In 2011 it had a population of 117 people.

References

Populated places in the Province of Cádiz
Tarifa
Beaches of Andalusia
Nude beaches
Populated coastal places in Spain